Czech Young Greens was the youth wing of the Czech Green Party. It was formed in 2000. The organisation supports the legalisation of cannabis and LGBT rights. In February 2019 it ceased its cooperation with Green Party as a reaction to party's cooperation with TOP 09 and Liberal-Environmental Party in 2019 European Parliament election in the Czech Republic. Organisation dissolved itself in June 2020.

Footnotes

External links
  Young Greens Official Website

Politics of the Czech Republic
Youth politics
2001 establishments in the Czech Republic
Youth wings of political parties in the Czech Republic
Green Party (Czech Republic)
Youth wings of green parties in Europe
Political organizations disestablished in 2020
Defunct organizations based in the Czech Republic